This is the discography of American rapper Tha Realest.

Albums

Studio albums
Witness Tha Realest 
Released: July 14, 2009
Label: RBC, Team Dime Entertainment, Koch Records
Chart positions: TBR (U.S. Top 200)
Singles: "Peep'n Game, Get It N"

Mixtapes
Tha Realest Presents: Me and My Mufuka'z
Released: 2005
Label: Omerta Entertainment
Witness Tha Realest Mixtape 
Released: October 3, 2006
Label: Tru 'Dat' Entertainment
Free to download
From East 2 West 
With: 730
Released: July 10, 2007
Label: Mob Life Records
Free to download
Tha Death Row Dayz Vol. 1 (2 CDs) 
Released: August 11, 2007
Label: For The People Entertainment
Tha Death Row Dayz Vol. 2
Released: November 29, 2007
Label: For The People Entertainment
Mob Muzik
With: Wack Deuce & G-Mack
Released: April, 2008
Label: Team Dime Entertainment
Single: "In The Streetz"

Guest appearances
 "Masta Plan" Eastside featuring Tha Realest (The Battlefield) (1997)
 "City" Eastside featuring Tha Realest, Chyné & Z Bennet (The Battlefield) (1997)
 "Free 'Em All" J-Flexx featuring Tha Realest & Stephanie Fredric (Gang Related – The Soundtrack) (1997)
 "A Change To Come" J-Flexx featuring Tha Realest, Bahamadia, Kool & the Gang & Con Funk Shun  (Gang Related – The Soundtrack) (1997)
 "It's Goin' Down" Mac Shawn featuring Daz Dillinger, Tha Realest & Black Tovin (Suge Knight Represents: Chronic 2000) (1999)
 "Because of You Girl" Tha Dogg Pound featuring Tha Realest (Suge Knight Represents: Chronic 2000) (1999)
 "Gangsta" The Relativez featuring Tha Realest (The Takeover) (2002)
 "C-Bo & Tha Realest" C-Bo featuring Tha Realest (The Mobfather) (2003)
 "Somebody Gone Die 2 Nite" Yukmouth featuring Benjilino, Tech N9ne, Hussein Fatal & Tha Realest (Godzilla) (2003)
 "United Ghettos Of America, Part 2" The Regime (Tha Realest, C-Bo, Spice 1, Dru Down, 151, Eastwood & Roscoe) (United Ghettos of America Vol. 2) (2004)
 "Me And My Mufuka'z" Tha Realest featuring G-Twin (Mob Life Records Presents On The Grind Vol.1) (2004)
 "Fuck You" 730 featuring Tha Realest & Swoop G (Spit In Ya Face) (2004)
 "Me and 730" 730 featuring Tha Realest (County Blues) (2005)
 "Blast First" The Regime (Messy Marv, Yukmouth & Tha Realest) (All Out War Volume 1) (2005)
 "They Wanna Be Like Us (Street Mix)" Top Dogg featuring Tha Realest & Doobie (Every Dogg Has His Day) (2005)
 "Payback" The Regime (C-Bo, Tha Realest, The Jacka, Yukmouth & Gonzoe) (All Out War Volume 2) (2005)
 "Bring Some Friendz" Speedy featuring Tha Realest (Flight Risk) (2005)
 "Live That Young Lyfe " Young Lyfe (featuring Tha Realest) (Real Lyfe) (2005)
 "Fuck Friends" Tha Realest (X Games) (2006)
 "What You Know About Gatz" The Regime (Yukmouth, Tha Realest, Dru Down) (All Out War Volume 3) (2006)
 "Trapp Ni99a" The Regime (Gonzoe, Yukmouth & Tha Realest) (All Out War Volume 3) (2006)
 "Tha M.O.B." The Regime (Yukmouth, Tha Realest, Monsta Ganjah & Kenny Kingpen) (All Out War Volume 3) (2006)
 "You Already Know" The Regime (Mike-Dee, Tha Realest, Monsta Ganjah & Yukmouth) (All Out War Volume 3) (2006)
 "Regime 4 Life" The Regime (Yukmouth, Tha Realest & Pretty Black) (All Out War Volume 3) (2006)
 "Still Know All About You'" Bizzy Bone featuring Tha Realest (Evolution of Elevation) (2006)
 "Addicted II Trouble" Yukmouth featuring Tha Realest (Million Dollar Mixtape) (2006)
 "Live A Full Life" C-Bo & Killa Tay featuring Tha Realest (The Moment of Truth) (2006)
 "Imma Killa" C-Bo & Killa Tay featuring Tha Realest & Mitchy Slick (The Moment of Truth) (2006)
 "Live Wire" Chop Black featuring Tha Realest (Mercenary Mixtape, Vol. 2: Stupid Hyphy) (2006)
 "Touchin' Tickets" Lil' Cyco featuring Tha Realest & Smigg Dirtee (Get Money, Have Heart) (2006)
 "Ridin' Wit Me" Lil' Cyco featuring Tha Realest & C-Bo (Get Money, Have Heart) (2006)
 "Get Out of Town" Pretty Black featuring Tha Realest, Monsta Gunjah & Fed X (Prince of the Streets) (2006)
 "Mob Muzik"  Yukmouth featuring Tha Realest & Monsta Gunjah (100 Racks) (2006)
 "They Mad I Laugh"  Yukmouth featuring Tha Realest & Pretty Black (100 Racks) (2006)
 "Wassup Homey"  Lefty Knucles featuring Tha Realest & Caliber (Dain Bramage) (2007)
 "West Coast " Tha Realest featuring Yukmouth & Lady Ice (Messy Marv Presents: Muzik Fo' Tha Taliban) (2007)
 "Certified Snitchez " Gramm Kracker featuring Yukmouth & Tha Realest (Certified Snitchez) (2007)
 "Shotcallaz " Gramm Kracker featuring Tha Realest, Spice 1 & Wacsta  (Certified Snitchez) (2007)
 "Breaded Out " Gramm Kracker featuring Tha Realest & Lil' Flip (Certified Snitchez) (2007)
 "Less Than Nothin' " Jayo Felony featuring Tha Realest, Spice 1, Gramm Kracker & more (Bang Bang Mixtape) (2007)
 "Street Lyfe " C-Bo featuring Tha Realest (West Side Ryders III: The Southeast Connection) (2007)
 "Getcha Mind Right " Yukmouth featuring C-Bo, Tha Realest & Trae tha Truth (United Ghettos of America: Eye Candy) (2007)
 "Hustlin'" Yukmouth featuring Tha Realest, Sean P. & C-Bo (The City of Dope, Vol. 1) (2007)
 "Shawty Is Da Shit (Remix)" The-Dream featuring Tha Realest (Rap Or Die Vol. 3) (2007)
 "Mobsta Mobsta" Yukmouth featuring Tha Realest, Tech N9ne & The Regime (Million Dollar Moupiece) (2008)
 "Who Want It" C-Bo featuring Tha Realest & Sassy (West Side Ryders IV : World Wide Mob) (2008)
 "Playa Hatin'" Gramm Kracker featuring Tha Realest, Spice 1 & Jayo Felony (A Season In Hell) (2008)
 "Mobbed Out" Gramm Kracker featuring Tha Realest (A Season In Hell) (2008)
 "Sparkin' It Up" Gramm Kracker featuring Tha Realest, Tech N9ne, Spice 1 & more (A Season In Hell) (2008)
 "Cry 4 Me Die 4 U" Top Dogg featuring Tha Realest & Sheeba Black (Dogg Dayz) (2008)
 "Imma Kash Getta" Infamous-C featuring Tha Realest & Gangsta Boo (V.I.P.) (2009)
 "Who Eva" Infamous-C featuring Tha Realest, Naudi Shawty, Loko & Hitman Sammy Sam (V.I.P.) (2009)
 "Thug Lova" Parlay Starr featuring Tha Realest (Welcome To My World) (2010)
 "If I Die" Thug Lordz (Yukmouth & C-Bo) featuring Tha Realest & Bo-Roc (Thug Money) (2010)
 "Lost That Thought" E.D.I. Mean & Nutt-So featuring Tha Realest (Ghetto Starz: Streets to the Stage) (2015)

References

Hip hop discographies
Discographies of American artists